Rhett Halkett (born 2 May 1986) is a South African former field hockey player who is the assistant coach of the Netherlands women's national team.

Club career
Halkett left South Africa in 2010 to play for Den Bosch in the Dutch Hoofdklasse. After his contract expired in 2013 he left Den Bosch for Laren. After one season at Laren, he played 5 seasons in the German Bundesliga for Mannheimer HC and UHC Hamburg.

International career
Halkett began playing for the South African national team in 2009. He competed at the 2010 Hockey World Cup in India, the 2010 Commonwealth Games in India, the 2012 Summer Olympics in England, the 2014 Hockey World Cup in The Netherlands, the Commonwealth Games. in Scotland. He is an African Cup of Nations gold medalist for 2009, 2013 and 2015. He won South African Men’s Player of the Year in 2016. After the 2018 World Cup he retired from the national team.

Coaching career
After he retired playing in 2019 at UHC Hamburg he became the assistant coach for the first women's team of the Hamburg club. In August 2020 he was appointed as the assistant coach of the Netherlands women's national team.

References

External links

1986 births
Living people
South African people of British descent
South African male field hockey players
Olympic field hockey players of South Africa
2010 Men's Hockey World Cup players
Field hockey players at the 2012 Summer Olympics
2014 Men's Hockey World Cup players
Field hockey players at the 2014 Commonwealth Games
2018 Men's Hockey World Cup players
Commonwealth Games competitors for South Africa
Field hockey players from Johannesburg
HC Den Bosch players
Men's Hoofdklasse Hockey players
Mannheimer HC players
Uhlenhorster HC players
South African field hockey coaches
Male field hockey defenders